was a Japanese woodblock printmaker and artist known for distinctive prints of owls, cats, and other animals in the style of naive or folk art.

Akiyama was born in 1921 in Takeda, Ōita Prefecture, on the island of Kyushu. He studied drawing under the direction of a Buddhist monk during his childhood, then at the Taiheiyo Bijutsu Gakkō, graduating 1956. He originally pursued suiboku-ga, a type of ink painting. However, Akiyama changed his focus to woodblock printing after meeting Shikō Munakata, under whom he studied from 1959 until 1965.

Akiyama's prints are primarily made in black ink, with his signature in red, although later works sometimes feature more colors. In his prints, Akiyama limited himself to few subjects: animals, nude female figures, and Buddhist monks. Akiyama's work often incorporated verses of haiku and other text by Japanese poets like Ryōkan Taigu, Kobayashi Issa, and Zen monk Santōka Taneda, as well as from his own original poetry.

Iwao Akiyama died in Matsudo, Chiba, on September 15, 2014, at the age of 93.

Collections
Examples of Akiyama's prints are currently held within the collections of the following institutions:
 British Museum 
 Cincinnati Art Museum 
 National Gallery of Victoria 
 National Museum of Scotland 
 Tikotin Museum of Japanese Art
 The U.S. Library of Congress

See also
Woodblock printing in Japan

References

1921 births
2014 deaths
Japanese printmakers
Japanese painters
People from Ōita Prefecture